Project Shadowchaser IV, also known as Shadowchaser IV, Shadowchaser: The Gates Of Time, Orion's Key and Alien Chaser, is a 1996 science fiction film by director Mark Roper. It is the fourth and final installment in the Project Shadowchaser film series.

Premise
After two archaeologists discover an ancient alien artifact in Africa, they must run for their lives from both the unstoppable guardian and protector that awakens as a result, and their greedy, madman employer, both of whom want the artifact.

Cast
 Frank Zagarino as Sirius
 Todd Jensen as Michael Cavanaugh
 Jennifer MacDonald as Corinne Cavanaugh
 Greg Melvill-Smith as Silver (as Greg Melvill Smith)
 Brian O'Shaughnessy as Professor Morton
 Dave Ridley as Operative #1
 Cordell McQueen as Operative #2 & Arturus
 Greg Poustie as Operative #3
 Chris Olley as Operative #4
 Lesley Fong as Operative #5
 Zane Meas as Operative #6
 Kim Windo as Operative #7
 Roly Jansen as Operative #8
 Tyrone Stevenson as Operative #9
 Bismilla Mdaka as Badimo Sangoma
 Struan Frost as Joey Cavanaugh
 Lindelani Buthelezi as Moses
 Samson Kombule as Sangoma 1
 Pamela Nomvete as Doctor Olin
 Italie Solomons as Policeman in Clinic
 Ian Yule as Odd Job
 Hector Rabotabi as James
 Lucky Mtshali as Dwarf in Bar (as Lucky)
 Vera Blacker as Sister George
 Thato Pitso as 12-year-old boy
 Dick Reineke as Leary
 Professor Mavuso as Doctor 1
 Sello Sebotsane as Sergeant Makojane
 Magi Williams as Jasmine
 Norman Coombes as Father Donald
 Neethling Du Plessis as Orion
 Michael Lewis as Procyon

DVD release
The DVD was released in 1999 by Image Entertainment under license from A-Pix Entertainment. The DVD has now been discontinued and as of March 18, 2010, no plans have been made to release a new DVD of the film.

See also
 Project Shadowchaser
 Project Shadowchaser II
 Project Shadowchaser III

External links
 

1996 films
1990s science fiction action films
American science fiction action films
American independent films
1996 independent films
Films shot in Kenya
Films shot in South Africa
Films shot in Zimbabwe
Films scored by Robert O. Ragland
Project Shadowchaser films
1990s English-language films
Films directed by Mark Roper
Films with screenplays by Boaz Davidson
Films about archaeology
1990s American films